Sir Walter Charles Frederick Carncross (23 April 1855 – 30 June 1940) was a New Zealand politician of the Liberal Party.

Biography

Early life
Carncross was born in Bendigo, Victoria, in 1855 (or 1853). He came to Dunedin with his parents when he was seven years old. Carncross married Mary, a daughter of R. Johnston in 1883. He was to become a newspaper proprietor by trade, owning both the Taieri Advocate & Eltham Argus.

Political career

He was in favour of perpetual leasing of land and opposed the sale of the railways. He was opposed to women's suffrage and in 1891 deliberately moved an amendment that was intended to make the bill fail in the Legislative Council. His amendment was for women to become eligible to be voted into the House of Representatives. He served as the Liberal Party's Senior Whip in 1902, his last year in the lower house

He was appointed to the Legislative Council on 18 March 1903 by the Liberal Government, and at the expiry of his seven-year terms, he was reappointed five times; on 18 March 1910, on 17 March 1917 & 17 March 1924 by the Reform Government; 17 March 1931 by the United Government; and 16 March 1938 by the First Labour Government. His district was Taranaki, and then Eltham from 1917.

He served on the Council until his death. He was elected Chairman of Committees on 6 July 1910 and served in this role until 1 November 1918, when he became Speaker, succeeding the deceased Charles Johnston. He remained Speaker until 18 July 1939; his 21-year service as speaker was an Empire record. He was succeeded by Labour's Mark Fagan during the time of the First Labour Government.

Carncross was appointed a Knight Bachelor in the 1922 King's Birthday Honours. In 1935, he was awarded the King George V Silver Jubilee Medal.

Death
Carncross died on 30 June 1940  at his home in Eltham, Taranaki. He was survived by Lady Carncross, a son and a daughter.

Notes

References

|-

1855 births
1940 deaths
Speakers of the New Zealand Legislative Council
Members of the New Zealand Legislative Council
New Zealand Knights Bachelor
New Zealand Liberal Party MPs
New Zealand Liberal Party MLCs
New Zealand MPs for Dunedin electorates
Members of the New Zealand House of Representatives
New Zealand businesspeople
Unsuccessful candidates in the 1887 New Zealand general election
Unsuccessful candidates in the 1884 New Zealand general election
19th-century New Zealand politicians
New Zealand politicians awarded knighthoods